Acon is a commune in the Eure department in Normandy in northern France.

Geography
Acon is a small country village divided by the Route nationale 12. On one side are the Brulés d'Acon and on the other are the Rousset and the Mesnil d'Acon. The Avre river flows between the Brulés and the Rousset et le Mesnil, not unlike the main road does.

Population

Sights
The St Denis church can be found next to the Avre river.

See also
Communes of the Eure department

References

Communes of Eure